The following is a list of people who were born in, residents of, or otherwise closely associated with Kohima, and its surrounding metropolitan area.

Kevichüsa Angami, born in Khonoma; Politician and Member of Parliament, representing Nagaland in the Lok Sabha the lower house of India's Parliament.
Neidonuo Angami, born in Kohima; Social worker and one of the founders of the Naga Mothers' Association
Talimeren Ao, born in Changki; Footballer and the captain of the India national football team
Neichülie-ü Nikki Haralu, born in Kohima; Indian Ambassador to Panama, Costa Rica and Nicaragua from 1978 to 1980.
John Bosco Jasokie, born in Khonoma; fifth Chief Minister of Nagaland
Neikezhakuo Kengurüse, born in Nerhema; Indian army officer
Hekani Jakhalu Kense, born in Dimapur; Lawyer and Social entrepreneur
Andrea Kevichüsa, born in Kohima; Actress and Model
Chalie Kevichüsa, born in Kohima; Journalist
Razhukhrielie Kevichüsa, born in Tezpur; Bureaucrat and Musician
Mmhonlümo Kikon, born in Kohima; Politician
P. Kilemsungla, born in Kohima; Educationist
Easterine Kire, born in Kohima; Poet and Author
Vizol Koso, born in Viswema; fourth Chief Minister of Nagaland
Salhoutuonuo Kruse, born in Kiruphema, first woman to be elected to the Nagaland Legislative Assembly
Khuplam Milui Lenthang, born in Kohima; Anthropologist, Doctor, and Ethnographer
Shürhozelie Liezietsu, born in Kohima; 11th Chief Minister of Nagaland
Macnivil, born in Kohima; Rapper, Songwriter and Music video director
Alobo Naga, born in Kohima; Singer and Songwriter
Thepfülo-u Nakhro, born in Jotsoma; second Chief Minister of Nagaland
Zale Neikha, born in Viswema; Politician
Kiyanilie Peseyie, born in Jotsoma; Politician
Viswesül Pusa, born in Viswema; Politician
Vizadel Sakhrie, born in Viswema; Politician
Chotisüh Sazo, Politician
Phulchand Sethi, born in Kohima; Businessperson
Methaneilie Solo, born in Kohima; Singer and Songwriter
Hari Prasad Gorkha Rai, born in Kohima; Writer
Tseilhoutuo Rhütso, born in Kohima; Politician 
Neiphiu Rio, born in Tuophema; Chief Minister of Nagaland
Hovithal Sothü, born in Viswema; Educationist
Mengu Süokhrie, born in Kohima; Actress and Singer 
Neiliezhü Üsou, born in Nerhema; Baptist minister
Lhüthiprü Vasa, born in Dzülhami; Politician 
Jonathan Yhome, born in Kohima; Singer and Songwriter
Vikho-o Yhoshü, born in Kigwema; Politician 
Sesino Yhoshü, born in Kohima; Filmmaker

References 

Kohima